Serme Khen Rinpoche Geshe Tashi Tsering BEM (born 1958) is abbot of Sera Mey Monastic University in India.  From 1994 to 2018, he was the resident Tibetan Buddhist teacher at Jamyang Buddhist Centre, London.

Tsering was born in Purang, Tibet in 1958, and his parents escaped to India in 1959. He entered Sera Mey Monastic University in South India when he was 13 years old, and graduated with a Lharampa Geshe degree 16 years later. Geshe Tashi then entered the Higher Tantric College (Gyuto) for a year of study.

Tsering's teaching career began at Sera, after which he taught the monks at Kopan Monastery, Nepal for a year. He went on to the Gandhi Foundation College in Nagpur, India and then moved to Europe, initially to Nalanda Monastery in the South of France.

From 1994 to 2018, Tsering was resident teacher at Jamyang Buddhist Centre in London.  In 2017 he received a masters degree in social anthropology from the School of Oriental and African Studies in London.
 
In the west, Tsering teaches in English and is renowned for his warmth, clarity and humour. Besides Jamyang, he has been a regular guest teacher at other Buddhist centres in the UK and around the world.  He is also the creator and original teacher of the Foundation of Buddhist Thought Course, a two-year course which gives an overview of Tibetan Buddhist study and practice.

In March 2018 it was announced that Geshe Tashi Tsering had been asked by the Dalai Lama to become abbot of Sera Mey Monastic University in India.  He was enthroned as abbot on 17 June 2018.

In June 2019 he was awarded the British Empire Medal in the Queen's birthday honours list for services to Buddhism in the UK.

Bibliography

Geshe Tashi Tsering, (2005). Four Noble Truths: The Foundation of Buddhist Thought, Volume 1 Wisdom Books, 
Geshe Tashi Tsering, (2008). Relative Truth, Ultimate Truth: The Foundation of Buddhist Thought, Volume 2 Wisdom Books, 
Geshe Tashi Tsering, (2006). Buddhist Psychology: The Foundation of Buddhist Thought, Volume 3, Wisdom Books, 
Geshe Tashi Tsering, (2008). The Awakening Mind: The Foundation of Buddhist Thought, Volume 4, Wisdom Books, 
Geshe Tashi Tsering, (2009). Emptiness: The Foundation of Buddhist Thought, Volume 5, Wisdom Books, 
Geshe Tashi Tsering, (2012). Tantra: The Foundation of Buddhist Thought, Volume 6, Wisdom Books,

References

External links
Geshe Tashi's dedicated website
Jamyang Buddhist Centre
Teachings by Geshe Tashi Tsering

Living people
20th-century Buddhists
21st-century Buddhists
Scholars of Buddhism from Tibet
Gelug Buddhists
Geshes
Tibetan Buddhism writers
Tibetan Buddhists from Tibet
1958 births
Tibetan Buddhist monks
Tibetan Buddhism in the United Kingdom
Recipients of the British Empire Medal